The Dunedin Classic was a professional golf tournament played at the Chisholm Park Golf Links near Dunedin, New Zealand. It was played in 2001, 2002 and 2004. Prize money was A$100,000 in 2001 and 2004 and A$125,000 in 2002. The events were sponsored by Scenic Circle Hotels.

Winners

Notes

References 

Golf tournaments in New Zealand
Sport in Dunedin